Sheryl Noethe is an American poet and served as Montana's poet laureate from 2011 to 2013.

Biography 
Born in Minnesota "into a family that didn't read books", Noethe discovered writing through a collection of Dorothy Parker's short stories and read voraciously to escape an abusive home life. In 5th grade, her teacher told her that she would become an author, which she credits with changing her life. By Noethe's teens, she had published poetry.

Honors 
Noethe has won or received the following honors:

 Academy of American Poets Award
 McKnight Foundation fellowship
 National Endowment for the Arts fellowship
 Montana Arts Council fellowship
 Emerging Voices Award – New Rivers Press
 Honorable mention – Pushcart Prize
 2004 Cultural Achievement Award from the Missoula Cultural Council for her work in Missoula schools

References

External links
Sheryl Noethe website

Year of birth missing (living people)
Living people
American women poets
Poets Laureate of Montana
Writers from Missoula, Montana
21st-century American women